The Elvis Presley Forever postage stamp is a part of the Music Icons series issued by the United States Postal Service.  It features Presley in a 1955 black and white photography taken by William Speer. The design created by Antonio Alcalá and Leslie Badani also features a golden crown and the signature of Presley on the side.

The stamp was dedicated on August 12, 2015, during a ceremony in Graceland, attended by Priscilla Presley and Postmaster General Megan Brennan. The release of the stamp was accompanied by a hit compilation album, Elvis Forever, sold through post offices around the United States and on the internet. Martin Luther King, Robert E. Lee, and Elvis Presley are the only three Americans to have been honored by commemorative stamps by the USPS on multiple occasions without having have been elected President of the United States. The first was issued in 1993.

The first stamps, and earliest known use (EKU), were purchased August 10, 2015 at the Mason, Tennessee post office by stamp collector David Saks.

References 

Postage stamps of the United States
Cultural depictions of Elvis Presley